Bankim Puraskar (Bankim Memorial Award) is the highest award given by the Government of West Bengal for contribution to Bengali fiction. The award was instituted in 1975 in memory of Bankim Chandra Chattopadhyay, a famous Bengali novelist of the 19th century. It has been brought under the aegis of Paschimbanga Bangla Akademi, functioning under the Department of Information & Cultural Affairs, in 2003. The award is handed over by the Chief Minister of West Bengal.

Awardees
1975 – Prabodh Chandra Sen
1982 – Gour Kishore Ghosh
1983 – Sunil Gangopadhyay – Sei Samay (novel, 2 vols.)
1984 – Sushil Jana<ref
name="who">Dutt, Kartik Chandra, Who's who of Indian Writers, 1999: A-M, Sahitya Akademi, 1999</ref>
1985 – Prafulla Roy – Akasher Neeche Manush (novel)
1986 – Amiya Bhushan Majumdar – Rajnagar (novel)
1987 – Amalendu Chakraborty – Jabajjiban (novel)
1988 – Sachindranath Bandyopadhyay<ref
name="who"/>
1990 – Dibyendu Palit
1991 – Kamal Kumar Majumdar – Galpasamagra (complete stories) (posthumous)
1992 – Abhijit Sen – Rahu Chandaler Harh (novel)
1993 –  Shankar (Mani Shankar Mukhopadhyay) – Gharer Madhye Ghar
1994 – Syed Mustafa Siraj – Aleek Manush (novel)
1995 – Manjush Dasgupta,<ref
name="who"/> Sandipan Chattopadhyay
1996 – Nabarun Bhattacharya – Harbart (novel) (award returned in 2007 in protest against the Nandigram violence)
1998 – Atin Bandyopadhyay – Dui Bharatbarsha (novel)
 ... ... . – Bani Basu
2000 – Narayan Sanyal – Rupamanjari (3 vols) (historical novel)
2001 – Samir Rakshit-Dukher Akhyan (Novel)]], 
2001 – Amar Mitra – Ashwacharit (novel)
2002 – Chitta Ghoshal – Nirbachita Galpo vol. 2 (selected stories)
 2002  . – Tapan Bandyopadhyay – Nadi, Mati, Aranya (3 vols.)
2004 – Bhagirath Mishra – Mrigaya
2005 – Sadhan Chattopadhyay
 ... ... . – Nabendu Ghosh – Chand Dekhechhilo (novel)
 ... ... . – Swapnamoy Chakraborty – Abantinagar (novel)
2006 – Ramkumar Mukhapadhyay
2007 – Jhareswar Chattopadhyay – Sohish
2008 – Kinnar Roy – Mrittukushum, Nalini Bera
2010 – Afsar Ahmed  – Hire Bhikharini O Sundori Ramoni Kissa 
2010 – Anil Ghorai – Ananta Draghima (Study on the use of colors in the works and paintings of Rabindranath Tagore)
2011 – Rabisankar Bal – Dozakhnama (novel)
2012 – Kamal Chakraborty
2014 – Ramanath Roy

See also
Rabindra Puraskar
Ananda Puraskar
List of Sahitya Akademi Award winners for Bengali
Bangla Academy Award

References

Bengali-language literature
Indian literary awards
Bengali literary awards
Civil awards and decorations of West Bengal